Henry Sonken (July 15, 1910 – August 11, 1996) was an American film, television and theatre actor. He was known for his appearances in the films Miss Sadie Thompson, Loan Shark, Hey Boy! Hey Girl!, Somebody Loves Me and Rock Around the Clock, and for playing the role of Bulldog Lovey in the American television series Adventures in Paradise. Slate died in August 1996 in Los Angeles, California, at the age of 86. He was cremated.

Partial filmography 

College Swing (1938) - Hangout Waiter (credited as "The Slate Brothers")
Winged Victory (1944) - Andrews Sister
You're in the Navy Now (1951) - Chief Engineer Ryan
Fourteen Hours (1951) - Cab Driver (uncredited)
The Frogmen (1951) - Sleepy
Rhubarb (1951) - Dud Logan
The Belle of New York (1952) - Police Sgt. Clancy (uncredited)
Just This Once (1952) - Jeff Parma
Loan Shark (1952) - Paul Nelson
Down Among the Sheltering Palms (1952) - Pvt. Thompson (uncredited)
O. Henry's Full House (1952) - Poker Player (uncredited)
Somebody Loves Me (1952) - Forrest
Bloodhounds of Broadway (1952) - Dave the Dudge
Stop, You're Killing Me (1952) - Ryan
The Jazz Singer (1952) - Master of Ceremonies (uncredited)
Pickup on South Street (1953) - Detective MacGregor (uncredited)
A Slight Case of Larceny (1953) - Motor Cop
Three Sailors and a Girl (1953) - Hank the Sailor
Miss Sadie Thompson (1953) - Pvt. Griggs
There's No Business Like Show Business (1954) - Dance Director (uncredited)
Three for the Show (1955) - Sgt. Kowalski (uncredited)
Hit the Deck (1955) - Shore Patrol
My Sister Eileen (1955) - Second Drunk
Meet Me in Las Vegas (1956) - Henry Slate (The Slate Brothers)
Rock Around the Clock (1956) - Corny LaSalle
He Laughed Last (1956) - Ziggy
Bus Stop (1956) - Manager of Blue Dragon Nightclub (uncredited)
Wink of an Eye (1958) - Attendant
Hey Boy! Hey Girl! (1959) - Marty Moran
Bedtime Story (1964) - Sattler
The Patsy (1964) - Paul
Looking for Lovw (1964) - Henry (uncredited)
A Big Hand for the Little Lady (1966) - Piano Player (uncredited)
Which Way to the Front? (1970) - German Officer (uncredited)
Pete 'n' Tillie (1972) - Desk Sergeant (uncredited)
The Strongest Man in the World (1975) - Mr. Slate
Gus (1976) - Fan
The Shootist (1976) - Pufford Confidant (uncredited)
The Shaggy D.A. (1976) - Taxi Driver
Pete's Dragon (1977) - Fisherman #2
The Cat from Outer Space (1978) - Sandwich Man
Norma Rae (1979) - Policeman
Little Miss Marker (1980) - Teller
Herbie Goes Bananas (1980) - Off-Watch Officer
Back Roads (1981) - Grover
Beyond Reason (1985) - Julius
Murphy's Romance (1985) - Fred Hite

References

External links 

Rotten Tomatoes profile

1910 births
1996 deaths
People from Brooklyn
Male actors from New York (state)
American male film actors
American male television actors
American male stage actors
20th-century American male actors